Sublette is an unincorporated community in northern Adair County, Missouri, United States. The community is on U.S. Route 63 about six miles north of Kirksville.

History
Sublette was laid out in 1869. It was named for its founders, P. J. and Sarah R. Sublette. A post office called Sublette was established in 1868, and remained in operation until 1933.

References

Unincorporated communities in Adair County, Missouri
Unincorporated communities in Missouri